On the death of Pope Sergius IV in June 1012, "a certain Gregory" opposed the party of the Theophylae (which elected Pope Benedict VIII against him), and had himself made pope, seemingly by a small faction.  Gregory VI was the first to claim to be pope as successor to Sergius IV, and that Benedict VIII's claim was subsequent.

Promptly expelled from Rome, Gregory made his way to Germany, and craved the support of the Emperor Henry II (25 December 1012). That monarch, however, after promising him that his case should be carefully examined in accordance with canon law and Roman custom, took away from him the papal insignia which he was wearing, and bade him cease to act as pope in the meanwhile. After this, history knows the "certain Gregory" no more.

Of Benedict VIII, the Catholic Encyclopedia says:

See also
 Papal selection before 1059

References

External links
 Catholic Encyclopedia, Pope Benedict VIII
 Catholic Encyclopedia, Antipope Gregory VI

Year of birth unknown
Year of death unknown
11th-century antipopes
11th-century Christian clergy
Gregory 06